"We're Going Over the Top" is a World War I song written by Andrew B. Sterling, Bernie Grossman, and Arthur Lange. It was published in 1917 by Joe Morris Music Co., in New York, NY.
The sheet music cover, designed by Starmer, illustrates a battlefield scene with a tank moving over the top of a trench and soldiers inside the trench getting out of the way of the tank. Behind the tank soldiers march up the field.

The sheet music can be found at the Pritzker Military Museum & Library, as well as the University of Maine.

References 

Bibliography
Jasen, David A. Tin Pan Alley: The Composers, the Songs, the Performers, and Their Times : the Golden Age of American Popular Music from 1886 to 1956. New York: D.I. Fine, 1988. . 
Parker, Bernard S. World War I Sheet Music 2. Jefferson: McFarland & Company, Inc., 2007. . 
Vogel, Frederick G. World War I Songs: A History and Dictionary of Popular American Patriotic Tunes, with Over 300 Complete Lyrics. Jefferson: McFarland & Company, Inc., 1995. . 

1917 songs
Songs of World War I
Songs with lyrics by Andrew B. Sterling
Songs with music by Arthur Lange